Arturo Ortiz may refer to:

 Arturo Ortiz (high jumper) (born 1966), Spanish high jumper
 Arturo Ortiz (footballer) (born 1992), Mexican footballer
 Arturo B. Ortiz (born 1955), Filipino general